Douglas R. Stringfellow (September 24, 1922 – October 19, 1966) was a Republican member of the United States House of Representatives for one term, best known for lying about his war record, education and achievements.

Biographical background 
Stringfellow was born in Draper, Utah.  While attending public schools, he moved to Ogden, Utah, where he graduated from high school in 1941.  He then attended Weber College until entering into service in the Army Air Force during World War II from 1942 to 1945. In France, Stringfellow was wounded in a mine explosion, leaving him walking with the aid of a cane, for which he received the Purple Heart Medal.

As a member of the Church of Jesus Christ of Latter-day Saints (LDS Church), Stringfellow served as a missionary in Northern California from 1947 to 1948. Stringfellow returned to pursue a career in broadcasting, serving as an announcer and executive for a Utah radio station from 1949 to 1952.

1952 election 
In 1952 Stringfellow, a political unknown, was elected to the U.S. House of Representatives as a Republican from Utah. Much of the appeal of his candidacy lay in his decorated past as a hero during World War II, a past which he made frequent reference to during his revival-style campaign speeches. Stringfellow was able to take advantage of Dwight Eisenhower's landslide presidential victory and defeated his Democratic opponent, Ernest McKay, in a rout of 76,545 votes (60.5%) to 49,898 votes (39.5%). His victory in the open-seat contest was a gain for the Republican Party.

Stringfellow claimed to have served as an agent of the OSS during the war. He claimed that at one point he had participated in a top-secret mission to rescue a German atomic physicist, Otto Hahn, from behind enemy lines and transport him to England. He also claimed that he had been captured by the Germans and held in Belsen Prison, where he had been brutally tortured, causing him to become a paraplegic. Stringfellow said that while lying wounded he had undergone an intense religious experience, and it was through this new-found faith, as well as the aid of the anti-Nazi underground, that he had escaped from the prison. He claimed that he had been awarded the Silver Star for his heroic service.

Stringfellow's colorful past was widely broadcast in the media. It even aired on the popular national television show This Is Your Life. Stringfellow also frequently traveled around Utah preaching about his wartime religious experience with the blessing of the LDS Church.

1954 election and exposure 
Stringfellow served one term and was running for reelection in 1954 when his past was exposed as a fraud by his Democratic opponents. They revealed that Stringfellow was not actually a paraplegic. He had been wounded in a mine explosion during a routine mission in France, but he could walk with the aid of a cane.

Furthermore, Stringfellow had not worked for the OSS. He had been a private in the Army Air Forces, and he had never earned the Silver Star. Stringfellow also claimed that he had attended Ohio State University and the University of Cincinnati, but neither institution had any record of his attendance.

When his Democratic opponents exposed him, the LDS Church pressed Stringfellow to make a public confession, which he did. The House Republican leadership forced him to abandon his bid for reelection, and replaced him on the ballot just sixteen days before the election with Utah State Agricultural College president Henry Dixon. Dixon managed to hold on to the seat for the Republicans in an election in which the Democrats took back control of the U.S. House of Representatives.

Later years and death 
Stringfellow tried to capitalize on his notoriety by going on a speaking tour, but it proved unsuccessful. He briefly resumed his career as a radio announcer and worked at various stations throughout Utah while always using a pseudonym. He died at the age of 44 from a heart attack in Long Beach, California. At the time of his death he was living in obscurity and working as a landscape painter.

See also 
 List of federal political scandals in the United States
 George Santos, another congressman who lied extensively about his past
 Dan Johnson, Kentucky state legislator who committed suicide in 2017 after fabrications about his past were revealed

References

External links 
 Official Congressional Biography Guide
 "Veterans: The Hoax" Time. October 25, 1954. "Like many other persons suddenly thrust into the limelight, I rather thrived on the adulation and new-found popularity ... I began to embellish my speeches with more picturesque and fanciful incidents. I fell into a trap, which in part had been laid by my own glib tongue".
 The Douglas R. Stringfellow Papers at the University of Utah Marriott Library Special Collections

1922 births
1966 deaths
20th-century Mormon missionaries
American Latter Day Saints
American Mormon missionaries in the United States
Hoaxes in the United States
Impostors
Ohio State University alumni
People from Draper, Utah
Politicians from Ogden, Utah
United States Army Air Forces soldiers
University of Cincinnati alumni
Weber State University alumni
United States Army personnel of World War II
1950s hoaxes
Republican Party members of the United States House of Representatives from Utah
20th-century American politicians